Darío Víttori (14 September 1921 – 19 January 2001) was an Italian born Argentine comic actor. His real name was Melito Darío Spartaco Margozzi. He was born on 14 September 1921 in Montecelio, Lazio, Italy, and died on 19 January 2001 in Buenos Aires, Argentina.

He had an extensive body of work in Argentine theatre, films and television.

Filmography

Chicos ricos (2000) Rubén
¿Los piolas no se casan...? (1981) Don Carmelo
Subí que te llevo (1980)
Frutilla (1980) Florencio Parravicini
Así es la vida (1977) Liberti
Los chantas (1975) Ingenieri
Las píldoras (1972)
Blum (1970)
¡Qué noche de casamiento! (1969)
Villa Cariño está que arde (1968)
Lo prohibido está de moda (1968)
Digan lo que digan (1967)
Las pirañas (1967)
Villa Cariño (1967)
¡Ésto es alegría! (1967) Sr. Venturini
De profesión sospechosos (1966) Sr. Andrade
Orden de matar (1965) Sacerdote
Los hipócritas (1965) Dr. Massini
Ritmo nuevo, vieja ola (1964)
La fin del mundo (1963)

External links

 

1921 births
2001 deaths
Italian emigrants to Argentina
Italian expatriates in Argentina
Naturalized citizens of Argentina
People of Lazian descent
Argentine male film actors
Argentine male stage actors
Argentine male television actors